Jason Dundas (born 25 July 1982) is an Australian-born television presenter, actor, producer and director, known for his roles as special correspondent for CBS's Entertainment Tonight, the host of The X Factor Australia in 2016, host of America's Best Dance Crew on MTV, VH1's Big Morning Buzz Live, travel series Getaway in Australia, and the founder and director of Dundas Media.

Personal life
Dundas was born in Penrith, Sydney, to Ross Dundas and Diane Dundas. 

He attended Jamison High School, and later went on to study at the School of Communication Arts at the University of Western Sydney where he studied a Bachelor of Design (Visual Communication). 

He won a contest to be the host of MTV Australia in 2003, after creating his own DIY video audition from his bedroom at 19 years old.

Dundas is married to Tayler Blackman.

Career

Filmography

Film

TV

Production

Dundas Media 
After studying graphic design at Sydney's School of Design, Dundas sold his first TV show to MTV when he was 21-years-old. He currently runs a Hollywood-based video production company, Dundas Media.

In 2019 Dundas created the weekly entertainment TV show The Watchlist from LA for Foxtel Australia. He is the show's executive producer, co-writer and host with the series currently in its fourth season with over 700 short-form episodes.

Entrepreneur

Dundas Fit 
As an entrepreneur, Dundas became the second men's ambassador of Australian department store David Jones. In this role, he fronted fashion campaigns Miranda Kerr and Jessica Gomes, starred in and produced video series, and developed his own activewear brand DundasFit, sold in 35 stores in Australia.

References

External links
 Jason Dundas Official Website
Jason Dundas Podcast Interview 
Jason Dundas 'The Bachelor' Interview 
Jason Dundas Instagram Selfie explanation 
Jason Dundas chatting 'The Bachelor'
Jason Dundas chatting 'Gumtree'

American television hosts
Australian television talk show hosts
Living people
Male actors from Sydney
1982 births
Australian music critics
Australian music journalists